Tiago Rocha (born 3 March 1985) is a Portuguese handball player for Sporting CP and the Portuguese national team.

He represented Portugal at the 2020 European Men's Handball Championship.

References

External links

1985 births
Living people
Portuguese male handball players
FC Porto handball players
Sporting CP handball players
Wisła Płock (handball) players
Expatriate handball players in Poland
Portuguese expatriate sportspeople in Poland